The Irrawaddy Flotilla Company (IFC) was a passenger and cargo ferry company, which operated services on the Irrawaddy River in Burma, now Myanmar. The IFC was Scottish-owned, and was managed by P Henderson & Company from Glasgow. The IFC operated from 1865 until the late 1940s. At its peak in the late 1920s, the IFC fleet was the largest fleet of river boats in the world, consisting of over 600 vessels carrying some 8-9 million passengers and 1¼ million tons of cargo a year.

Beginnings

The IFC was formed in 1865 as the Irrawaddy Flotilla and Burmese Steam Navigation Co Ltd, primarily to ferry troops up and down the Irrawaddy River and delta. Soon, the company was carrying passengers, rice, government stores, and mail from Rangoon to Prome, Thayetmyo and Mandalay, and then extended in 1868 to Bhamo. In 1875, the company's name was shortened to the Irrawaddy Flotilla Company. Although registered in Glasgow, the operational headquarters were in Rangoon, with a major shipyard across the river at Dalla.

The company's services became indispensable to the oil fields up river at Yenangyaung and Chauk for carrying supplies and heavy equipment. Partly because the railway to Mandalay followed the path of the Sittaung River rather than the Irrawaddy River, the company stayed relevant and useful well into the twentieth century, even after independence from Britain.

The ships, most of which were paddle steamers, were generally built in Scotland before being dismantled and transported to Burma for reassembly. When the Japanese invaded Burma in World War II, the Manager of the IFC's Burma fleet, John Morton, ordered the scuttling of all 600 ships in his fleet. This prevented the Japanese from having a usable, local fleet for transport up the Irrawaddy River. In 1948 the company was reconstituted as the Government Inland Water Transport Board.

Quote
The paddle steamers of the IFC inspired the famous lines penned by Rudyard Kipling:
By the old Moulmein Pagoda, lookin' lazy at the sea,
There's a Burma girl a-settin', and I know she thinks o' me;
For the wind is in the palm-trees, and the temple-bells they say:
"Come you back, you British soldier; come you back to Mandalay!"
Come you back to Mandalay,
Where the old Flotilla lay:
Can't you 'ear their paddles chunkin' from Rangoon to Mandalay?
On the road to Mandalay,
Where the flyin'-fishes play,
An' the dawn comes up like thunder outer China 'crost the Bay!

References

External links

Photograph of the  Beeloo, a mail steamer of the IFC.

History of Myanmar
British rule in Burma
Water transport in Myanmar
Service companies of Myanmar
Scotland and the British Empire
Companies based in Glasgow